Gordon Joseph Reid (February 19, 1910 — November 12, 1994) was a Canadian professional ice hockey defenceman who played in one National Hockey League game for the New York Americans during the 1936–37 season, on December 29, 1936 against the New York Rangers. The rest of his career, which lasted from 1929 to 1944, was spent in the minor leagues.

He died at a hospital in Bracebridge, Ontario in 1994 and was buried alongside his wife, Audrey at the Bracebridge Municipal Cemetery.

Career statistics

Regular season and playoffs

See also
 List of players who played only one game in the NHL

References

External links

1910 births
1994 deaths
Canadian ice hockey defencemen
Ice hockey people from Ontario
Kansas City Greyhounds players
New Haven Eagles players
New York Americans players
Ontario Hockey Association Senior A League (1890–1979) players
People from East Gwillimbury
Providence Reds players
St. Paul Saints (AHA) players